Family Food Fight may refer to:
 Family Food Fight (Australian TV series), an Australian reality television series
 Family Food Fight (American TV series), an American adaptation
 Familias frente al fuego, a Mexican adaptation